Trip is the second album from the synthpop act Cause and Effect. It is dedicated to the memory of Sean Rowley. The album includes the song "It's Over Now," which reached number seven on the Billboard Modern Rock Tracks chart. It was released in 1994 under the BMG label.

Track listing
 "It's Over Now" – 4:09
 "Inside Out" – 4:20
 "Alone" – 4:29
 "In Shakespeare's Garden" – 4:55
 "You Are The One" – 4:58
 "Soul Search" – 4:42
 "Stone Girl" – 4:01
 "She Said" – 4:52
 "Sinking" – 5:07
 "Crash" – 6:13

Personnel
Robert Rowe – vocals, guitars 
Keith Milo – synths, programming, vocals 
Richard Shepherd – drums, programming, vocals

Produced by Martyn Phillips

References

Cause and Effect (band) albums
1994 albums
Bertelsmann Music Group albums